Ernst von Mengersdorf (1554–1591) was the Prince-Bishop of Bamberg from 1583 to 1591.

Biography

Ernst von Mengersdorf was born in Bamberg on October 23, 1554.

He was elected Prince-Bishop of Bamberg on September 2, 1583, with Pope Gregory XIII confirming his appointment on November 21, 1583.  He was consecrated as a bishop by Julius Echter von Mespelbrunn, Bishop of Würzburg, on May 20, 1584.

He died on October 21, 1591, and is buried in Michaelsberg Abbey, Bamberg.

References

1554 births
1591 deaths
Prince-Bishops of Bamberg